BH, Bh or bh may refer to:

Medicine 
 Bernard-Horner syndrome,  a combination of symptoms that arises when a group of nerves known as the sympathetic trunk is damaged
 Borderline hypertensive, an American medical classification for cases where a person's blood pressure is elevated above normal, but not to the level considered hypertension
 Bronchial hyperresponsiveness, a state characterised by easily triggered bronchospasm
 Bundle of His, collection of heart muscle cells specialized for electrical conduction

Science and technology
 BH register, in computer architectures
 Bohrium, symbol Bh, a chemical element
 Boron monohydride, chemical formula BH, a chemical compound
 Black hole

Places
 BH postcode area, a region in southern England served by Bournemouth postal sorting office
 Bahrain (ISO 3166-1 country code BH)
 .bh, the Internet country code top-level domain for Bahrain
 Belize's WMO and obsolete NATO country code digram
 Belo Horizonte, the capital of Minas Gerais, Brazil
 Beverly Hills, a city in Los Angeles County, California, US
 Bosnia and Herzegovina (reporting mark BiH or B&H)
 Bihor County, Romania

Businesses
 B&H Rail (reporting mark BH)
 Beistegui Hermanos, a Spanish bicycle manufacturer
 Hawkair (IATA airline code BH)

Religion
 B'ezrat hashem or B"H, Hebrew for "with God's help"
 Brotherhood of Hope, a Catholic association of the faithful
 Before Hijra, years before the epoch of the Islamic calendar

Other uses
 bh (digraph), a digraph in some writing systems
 .bh, the Internet country code top-level domain for Bahrain
 Bihari languages, a group of languages (ISO 639-1 language code bh)
 Broadcasting House (radio programme)
 Before Hijra, years before the epoch of the Islamic calendar

See also
B&H (disambiguation)
HB (disambiguation)